George Jones (February 25, 1766November 13, 1838) was a United States senator from Georgia. Born in Savannah, he received an academic training, studied medicine with his father, and practiced for a number of years. He participated in the American Revolutionary War. He was captured by the British Army as a prisoner of war and during 1780 and 1781 was imprisoned upon an English ship. He was later a member of the Georgia House of Representatives and Georgia Senate, and during the War of 1812 he served as captain of a company of Savannah reserves. He was a member of the Savannah board of aldermen in 1793–1794, 1802–1803, and 1814–1815, and was mayor of Savannah from 1812 to 1814. He was appointed judge of the eastern judicial circuit of Georgia in 1804, and served until he became a U.S. senator, appointed to fill the vacancy caused by the death of Abraham Baldwin and serving from August 27, 1807, to November 7, 1807, when a successor was elected.

Jones died in Savannah and was interred in Bonaventure Cemetery.

His father, Noble Wimberly Jones, was a Georgia delegate to the Continental Congress, and his grandfather, Noble Jones, was one of Georgia's first settlers.

See also

Wormsloe Historic Site
510 East York Street, one of his former properties in Savannah

References
 
 

1766 births
1838 deaths
American militiamen in the War of 1812
American Revolutionary War prisoners of war held by Great Britain
American people of English descent
Georgia (U.S. state) state senators
Georgia (U.S. state) state court judges
Mayors of Savannah, Georgia
Members of the Georgia House of Representatives
United States senators from Georgia (U.S. state)
Democratic-Republican Party United States senators
Georgia (U.S. state) Democratic-Republicans
American slave owners
United States senators who owned slaves